Thomas Halpin is an Irish submission grappler and Brazilian jiu-jitsu black belt competitor. Halpin is a Combat Jiu-Jitsu World Champion, an ADCC European Champion and a black belt European No-Gi medallist, as well as a European No-Gi Open Champion in brown belt.

Biography 
Thomas Halpin was born on 9 November 1993 in Limerick, Ireland. He started Brazilian jiu-jitsu in 2011 under Rodrigo Medeiros black belt, Fergal Quinlan, while studying sports and exercise science at University. From 2014 Halpin started going to Miami to train under Robert 'Cyborg' Abreu at Fight Sport from whom he received his brown and black belt in 2017.

Halpin became the first Irishman to qualify and compete at the ADCC World Championship after winning the ADCC European Trials in 2019. In 2020 after submitting all his opponents, including MMA fighter Masakazu Imanari, Halpin became featherweight Combat Jiu-Jitsu World Champion.

He currently competes in the featherweight division for Polaris Pro Grappling, being the number one featherweight contender. During the first Polaris 14 Squads event in September 2020, he defeated Dino Bucalet (from Team EU) via reverse triangle, securing the wining point for Team British Isles. At Polaris 21 Halpin defeated Alessio Sacchetti via unanimous decision.

Championships and accomplishments 
Main Achievements (black belt level):
 ADCC European Trials Winner (2019)
 Combat Jiu-Jitsu World Champion (2020)
 UAEJJF Spain National Pro Champion (2018)
 UAEJJF Netherlands National Pro Champion (2018)
 3rd place IBJJF European No-Gi Open (2018)

Main Achievements (coloured belts):
 IBJJF European No-Gi Open Champion (2016 brown)
 Grappling Pro Champion (2016 brown)

Instructor lineage 
Carlos Gracie > Carlson Gracie > Francisco Toco > Roberto Abreu > Thomas Halpin

Notes

References 

Irish practitioners of Brazilian jiu-jitsu
Living people
People awarded a black belt in Brazilian jiu-jitsu
Irish submission wrestlers
Sportspeople from Limerick (city)
European No-Gi Brazilian Jiu-Jitsu Championship medalists
1993 births